The 1887 Men's tennis tour was composed of the twelfth annual pre-open era tour incorporating 126 tournaments.

The tour began in January in Napier, New Zealand and ended in December in Christchurch, New Zealand.

Summary of tour 
Prior to the creation of the International Lawn Tennis Federation and the establishment of its world championship events in 1913 the Wimbledon Championships, the U.S. National Championships, the Irish Lawn Tennis Championships and the Northern Championships were considered by players and historians as the four most important tennis tournaments to win.

In the first big tournament of the year Ernest Renshaw wins a second Irish Lawn Tennis Championships title, in Dublin after a five-year break beating three-time defending champion Herbert Lawford in four sets. At the Wimbledon Championships Herbert Lawford avenges his Irish championships defeat by beating Ernest Renshaw for the title in five sets. At the Northern Championships in Liverpool, Harry Grove the defending champion defeats George Ernest Dixon Brown in five sets.
In the United States Dick Sears wins a seventh consecutive US National Championship beating Henry Slocum in three sets.

In March in the United States the inaugural Southern California Championships is staged for the first time this year and in New Zealand the Auckland Tennis Championships are held for the first time. In April in England Ernest Lewis defeats Edward Lake Williams in three sets for his first British Covered Court Championships. In May in South Asia, Charles Edward De Fonblanque defeats Edward George Farquharson in the Ceylon Championships held on the clay courts Nuwara Eliya.

In early June at the Scottish Championships held in Edinburgh Harry Grove of England defeats two-time defending champion Patrick Bowes-Lyon in five sets. In late June at the Welsh Championships in Penarth Irish player Ernest Browne wins a second title after English player James Baldwin retired after two sets to love down. In July in North America at the Canadian National Championships held in Toronto, Canada Charles Smith Hyman wins a third title defeating Lawrence H. Baldwin in three sets. In August the Nottinghamshire Championships are staged for the first time in England this event is known today as the Nottingham Open.

In October back in the United States Philip Shelton Sears representing Harvard wins his first national Intercollegiate Championships at New Haven, Connecticut defeating G.G. Shaw jr in three sets. In late December in Australasia at Christchurch, New Zealand Percival Clennell Fenwick wins his second national New Zealand Championships defeating Richard Dacre Harman in five sets.

Calendar 

Notes 1: Challenge Round: the final round of a tournament, in which the winner of a single-elimination phase faces the previous year's champion, who plays only that one match. The challenge round was used in the early history of tennis (from 1877 through 1921), in some tournaments not all.* Indicates challenger

Notes 2:Tournaments in italics were events that were staged only once that season

Key

January

February 
No events

March

April

May

June

July

August

September

October

November

December

List of tournament winners
The list of winners by number of singles titles won:
  Ernest Wool Lewis—Bournemouth, Chiswick Park, Eastbourne, Stamford Bridge, Teignmouth, Torquay—(6)
  Henry Slocum—Harrison, Livingston, Nahant, New Haven, Wentworth—(5)
  H.W. Fletcher—Chapel Allerton, Ilkley, Stockton-on-Tees, Whitby—(4)
  Ernest Browne—Cheltenham, Penarth, Scarborough—(3)
  Harry Grove—Northern Championships, Liverpool, Bath, Exmouth—(3)
  Patrick Bowes-Lyon—Dublin, Edinburgh, Newcastle upon Tyne—(3)
  Robert L. Beeckman—Bar Harbor, Eleberon, Hoboken—(3)
  Willoughby Hamilton—Dublin (Fitzwilliam), Dublin (Landsdowne), Howth—(3)
  Charles Gladstone Eames—Rochester, Stevenage—(2)
   Grainger Chaytor—Kilkenny, Parsonstown—(2)
  Ernest George Meers—Leyton, Leyton (2nd)—(2)
  Francis Seymour (Frank) Noon— –(2)
  Frederick William Snook—Nottingham, Nottingham (2nd) –(2) 
  Henry Augustus Taylor–Stentonn, Southampton—(2)
  Percival Clennell Fenwick—Napier, Napier (2nd) –(2)
  Valentine Gill Hall—Hitchin, Tivoli–(2)
   Ernest Renshaw–Irish Championships, Dublin–(1)
  Herbert Lawford-Wimbledon, London-(1)
  James Dwight–(1)
   Manliffe Goodbody–(1)
  Richard Sears–U.S. National Championships,Newport, Rhode Island–(1)

Notes

References

Sources 
 A. Wallis Myers, ed. (1903). Lawn Tennis at Home and Abroad (1st ed.). New York: Charles Scribner's Sons. OCLC 5358651.
 Baily's Monthly Magazine of Sports and Pastimes, and Racing Register, A.H. Baily & Company of Cornhill. London. England. July 1887
 Gillmeister, Heiner (1998). Tennis:Cultural History. London: A&C Black. .
 Hall, Valentine Gill (1889). Lawn tennis in America. Biographical sketches of all the prominent players, knotty points, and all the latest rules and directions governing handicaps, umpires, and rules for playing. D. W. Granbery & Co. New York, NY, USA:
 Lake, Robert J. (2014). A Social History of Tennis in Britain: Volume 5 of Routledge Research in Sports History. Routledge:. .
 Mazak, Karoly (2017). The Concise History of Tennis. Independently published. .
 Nauright, John; Parrish, Charles (2012). Sports Around the World: History, Culture, and Practice. Santa Barbara, Calif.: ABC-CLIO. .
 Nieuwland, Alex (2009–2017). "Tournaments – Search for Tournament – Year – 1887". www.tennisarchives.com. Harlingen, Netherlands: Idzznew BV.
 Paret, Jahial Parmly; Allen, J. P.; Alexander, Frederick B.; Hardy, Samuel [from old catalogue (1918). Spalding's tennis annual . New York, NY, USA: New York, American sports publishing company.
 The Australian Dictionary of Biography (1966–2021). Including a supplementary volume of ‘missing persons’ have, so far, been published. Volumes 1–19. The National Centre of Biography. Australian National University. Canberra. Australia.
 The John Player Nottingham Tennis Tournament: Record of Winners Nottingham Lawn Tennis Tournament (1887–1970)" (PDF).https://www.nottinghamcastleltc.co.uk/history/?d=John+Player+Nottingham+Tennis+Tournament+1971.pdf. Nottingham Castle LTC. Notts Lawn Tennis Association. 7 June 1971. pp. 1–7.

Further reading
 A. Wallis Myers, ed. (1903). Lawn Tennis at Home and Abroad (1st ed.). New York: Charles Scribner's Sons.
 Ayre's Lawn Tennis Almanack And Tournament Guide, 1908 to 1938, A. Wallis Myers.
 Baily's Monthly Magazine of Sports and Pastimes, and Racing Register, A.H. Baily & Company of Cornhill. London. England. 1860 to 1889
 Baily's Magazine of Sports and Pastimes, A.H. Baily & Company of Cornhill. London. England. 1889 to 1900
 Baily's Magazine of Sports and Pastimes, Vinton and Co. London. England. 1900 to 1926.
 British Lawn Tennis and Squash Magazine, 1948 to 1967, British Lawn Tennis Ltd, UK.
 Dunlop Lawn Tennis Almanack And Tournament Guide, G.P. Hughes, 1939 to 1958, Dunlop Sports Co. Ltd, UK
 Lawn tennis and Badminton Magazine, 1906 to 1973, UK.
 Lowe's Lawn Tennis Annuals and Compendia, Lowe, Sir F. Gordon, Eyre & Spottiswoode
 Spalding's Lawn Tennis Annuals from 1885 to 1922, American Sports Pub. Co, USA.
 Total Tennis:The Ultimate Tennis Encyclopedia, by Bud Collins, Sport Classic Books, Toronto, Canada, 
 The Tennis Book, edited by Michael Bartlett and Bob Gillen, Arbor House, New York, 1981 
 The World of Tennis Annuals, Barrett John, 1970 to 2001.

External links 
 http://www.tennisarchives.com/tournaments/search/1887

Pre Open era tennis seasons
1887 in tennis